Westwood is a neighborhood located in southern Memphis, Tennessee, United States, west of Whitehaven. The neighborhood is home to recreational facilities, businesses, schools and churches; including the more than 4,000 member Mt. Vernon Baptist Church. Westwood, Charles Powell Community Center, Westwood Shopping Center, Freedom Preparatory Academy-Westwood Elementary and Westwood High School  are focal-points of the community.  Double Tree Montessori School is west of Weaver Road and south of Western Park Drive.

Boundaries

Westwood is bounded by S Third Street on the east,  ICCR on the west, Raines Road on the north and W Shelby Drive on the south.

History
The Weaver Family, whose ancestors owned a  cotton plantation, sold some of their land in the 1950s for development of a subdivision in the southern section of Shelby County. The subdivision became Westwood and later the area in and near the subdivision was annexed into Memphis. As the neighborhood grew in the 1960s, businesses were built and established to serve the residents. Along with the growth of Westwood, was The Hill Top which includes the Double Tree Road vicinity. The growth continued in the 1970s when a large number of blacks began moving into the neighborhood. In 1973, Rev. James Netters moved his congregation, Mt Vernon Baptist Church, from Mississippi Boulevard to the former all-white Westwood Baptist Church on Parkrose. In 1991, the renovation of Mt. Vernon Baptist Church Westwood was completed and now it is one of the largest congregations in Memphis.

Annexation

In 1966, some parts of Westwood were annexed into the City of Memphis, and on January 1, 1972, the reminder of the area were officially annexed into the city.

References

McCorkle, Anna Leigh (1967). Tales Of Old Whitehaven.

Neighborhoods in Memphis, Tennessee